The Three Sisters Range is a subrange of the Stikine Ranges, located northwest of junction of the Stikine and McBride Rivers in northern British Columbia, Canada and to the southeast of the community of Dease Lake.

References

Three Sisters Range in the Canadian Mountain Encyclopedia

Stikine Country
Stikine Ranges